Alexander Thomson Burr (November 1, 1893 – October 12, 1918) was a Major League Baseball player who was killed in World War I. Born in Chicago, Illinois, Burr was known as "Tom" to his friends. Press accounts throughout his life, as well as other memoirs, used this nickname, although many baseball references labeled him "Alex".

Biography

Burr attended The Choate School (later Choate Rosemary Hall), where he was a star pitcher. He then went to Williams College, although he turned pro before he ever played a collegiate game. Burr made the New York Yankees roster as a pitcher under manager Frank Chance. However, his only game appearance for the Yankees (on April 21, 1914) came in center field. He had no fielding chances and did not have a plate appearance.

Burr returned to Williams College after his pro career ended, although by some accounts he went into business instead of returning to school. He volunteered to serve in the war before ever graduating. He self-financed his trip to France where he volunteered as an ambulance driver before joining the aviation corps. He was killed shortly before the war ended in an airplane accident on October 12, 1918 while serving in the United States Army Air Service in Cazaux, France. After colliding with a fellow pilot, Burr's plane crashed into a lake in flames; his body was recovered after 12 days. He had been serving in France since November 1917 and was 24 years old at the time of his death.

Burr was interred in American Expeditionary Forces Cemetery No. 29. During the years after the end of World War I, this cemetery was deconsecrated. Some of the bodies exhumed—including Burr's—were repatriated. Tom Burr's final resting place became Rosehill Cemetery and Mausoleum in Chicago.

Burr was one of eight Major League Baseball players known either to have been killed or died from illness while serving in the armed forces during World War I.  The others were Harry Chapman, Larry Chappell‚ Harry Glenn, Eddie Grant‚ Newt Halliday, Ralph Sharman and Bun Troy.

See also
 List of baseball players who died during their careers

References

External links

 Article on Burr's Death from Chicago Daily Tribune, 1918
 Baseball Almanac
 "Those Who Served"

New York Yankees players
1893 births
1918 deaths
Jersey City Skeeters players
Baseball players from Chicago
American military personnel killed in World War I
United States Army Air Service pilots of World War I
Military personnel from Illinois